The Johnstown Flood is a 1989 American short documentary film directed by Charles Guggenheim about the Johnstown Flood. David McCullough, author of the 1968 book, The Johnstown Flood, hosted the film. The film won the Oscar at the 62nd Academy Awards for Documentary Short Subject.

Cast
 Len Cariou as narrator
 David McCullough as host

References

External links
 
 

1989 films
1989 independent films
1980s short documentary films
American Experience
American short documentary films
American independent films
Best Documentary Short Subject Academy Award winners
Films directed by Charles Guggenheim
Documentary films about disasters
Documentary films about United States history
Johnstown, Pennsylvania
1980s English-language films
1980s American films